Heiðar Geir Júlíusson (born 16 August 1987) is an Icelandic footballer who played as a midfielder.

He joined the coaching staff of Kvik Halden FK in 2020. In early 2022, he became acting head coach after Jørgen La Cour Strand had to take a health leave. After guiding Kvik Halden through 2022, Júlíusson did not reach an agreement regarding a continued deal. Instead, he signed for FK Ørn Horten as their new head coach.

References

 

1987 births
Living people
Heidar Geir Juliusson
Knattspyrnufélagið Fram players
Hammarby Fotboll players
Ängelholms FF players
Fylkir players
Knattspyrnufélagið Þróttur players
Hamarkameratene players
IK Brage players
Heidar Geir Juliusson
Expatriate footballers in Sweden
Heidar Geir Juliusson
Expatriate footballers in Norway
Heidar Geir Juliusson
Úrvalsdeild karla (football) players
Allsvenskan players
Superettan players
Norwegian First Division players
Association football midfielders
Heidar Geir Juliusson
Expatriate football managers in Norway